Sesfontein Constituency is an electoral constituency in the Kunene Region of Namibia. Its district capital is the settlement of Sesfontein. The constituency had a population of 7,358 in 2004. , it has 5,614 registered voters. 

Sesfontein Constituency is bordered by Khorixas Constituency to the south, Kamanjab Constituency to the east, Opuwo Rural to the north and Okahao Constituency in Omusati Region to the northeast. Sesfontein is the only settlement in this constituency but this vast area contains a number of tourism facilities like the Palmwag and Warmquelle lodges.

Politics
Sesfontein Constituency voters traditionally supported electing opposition parties for the National Assembly and President.

Regional elections
The 2004 regional election was won by an opposition candidate, Hendrik Gaobaeb of the United Democratic Front) (UDF). The 2015 regional election was won by Julius Koujova of the SWAPO Party with 1,514 votes, Gaobaeb of the UDF came second with 1,063 votes. Independent candidates Asser Ndjitezeua and Timotheus Hochobeb followed with 328 and 272 votes respectively. Amon Kapi of the Rally for Democracy and Progress (RDP) also ran and received 87 votes. In the 2020 regional election Gaobaeb (UDF) again became constituency councillor with 1,327 votes, closely followed by SWAPO's Koujova with 1,251 votes.

Presidential elections
In the 2004 Namibian general election, Sesfontein was one of the few constituencies in Namibia to vote for an opposition candidate for president in the latest presidential election, 2004. In that year, Justus ǁGaroëb of the UDF received the most votes for president with 1,259 (46.01%) total votes, while Hifikepunye Pohamba (SWAPO), who won more than 76% of the national vote, received only 896 votes (32.78%) in the constituency. Nationally, Sesfontein represented approximately 4% of ǁGaroëb's vote despite only representing less than .0033% of the national vote for president. 

In 2009, Sesfontein Constituency again supported the UDF (1142 or 38.36%), though to a lesser degree than in 2004. SWAPO improved their vote total and percentage to 1092 from 896 (32.78% to 36.68%).

See also
 Administrative divisions of Namibia

References

Constituencies of Kunene Region
States and territories established in 1992
1992 establishments in Namibia